Francis John Dunn (March 22, 1922 – November 17, 1989) was a bishop in the Catholic Church in the United States. He served as an auxiliary bishop of the Archdiocese of Dubuque in the state of Iowa from 1969 to 1989.

Biography

Early life and ministry
Dunn was born in Elkader, Iowa, the son of Peter and Josephine (Feeney) Dunn. He was educated at St Joseph Grade and High School in Elkader before receiving his college education at Loras College in Dubuque. He studied for the priesthood at Kenrick Seminary in St. Louis.

Dunn was ordained a priest for the Archdiocese of Dubuque on January 11, 1948, by Auxiliary Bishop Edward Fitzgerald at St. Raphael’s Cathedral. He served as the associate pastor at St. Cecilia Parish in Ames from 1948-1950, St. Martin Parish in Cascade from 1950 to 1952, and at Nativity Parish in Dubuque from 1952 to 1955. In 1956 he was named assistant chancellor and chaplain of St. Anthony’s Home for the Aged in Dubuque. He was sent to Rome for further studies and when he returned he served as chancellor and head of the Family Life Bureau. From 1961 to 1969 he served as the chaplain for the Sisters of Charity of the Blessed Virgin Mary at the Mount Carmel Motherhouse and as Director of Catholic Cemeteries for the archdiocese.

Auxiliary Bishop of Dubuque
On June 1, 1969, Pope Paul VI named Dunn Titular Bishop of Turris Tamalleni and Auxiliary Bishop of Dubuque.  He was ordained a bishop by Archbishop James Byrne of Dubuque in St. Raphael’s Cathedral on August 27, 1969.  The principal co-consecrators were Archbishop Leo Binz of St. Paul and Minneapolis and Bishop Edward Fitzgerald now of Winona. His was the first episcopal ordination in the archdiocese that used the Rite of Ordination in English. While he served as auxiliary bishop in Dubuque he was also the vicar general of the archdiocese and pastor of St. Joseph the Worker Church.  On February 8, 1987, Archbishop Daniel Kucera announced his plans to divide the archdiocese into three regions with a resident bishop in each region. Bishop Dunn served the Cedar Rapids Region, Bishop William Franklin served the Waterloo Region, and the archbishop in Dubuque. Dunn died in Cedar Rapids, Iowa on November 17, 1989 at the age of 67.

References

1922 births
1989 deaths
20th-century Roman Catholic bishops in the United States
Loras College alumni
Roman Catholic Archdiocese of Dubuque
People from Elkader, Iowa
People from Cedar Rapids, Iowa
Religious leaders from Iowa
Catholics from Iowa